Təzəkənd (also, Tazakend) is a village and municipality in the Tartar Rayon of Azerbaijan.

References 

Populated places in Tartar District